The women's team competition of the table tennis event at the 2015 Southeast Asian Games were held from 6 to 8 June at the Singapore Indoor Stadium in Singapore.

Schedule

Results

Preliminary round

Group A

Group B

Knockout round

Semifinals

Gold medal match

References

External links
 

Women's team
Women's sports competitions in Singapore
South